Jianlong Steel  is the largest private-owned enterprise in Tangshan, Hebei province with the output of crude steel 6.5 million tonnes in a year. The company was established in the year 2000, from near-bankrupt predecessor Zunhua Steel.

Tangshan Jianlong Steel is a subsidiary of the large domestic private enterprise Beijing Jianlong Group.

References

External links
jianlongsteels.com (About)
Jianlong Group
History of Jianlong Steel

Steel companies of China
2000 establishments in China